The Stolpersteine in the Jihočeský kraj lists the Stolpersteine in the Czech region Jihočeský kraj (South Bohemian Region). Stolpersteine is the German name for stumbling blocks collocated all over Europe by German artist Gunter Demnig. They help us remember the fate of the Nazi victims being murdered, deported, exiled or driven to suicide.

Generally, the stumbling blocks are located in front of the building where the victims had their last self chosen residence. The name of the Stolpersteine in Czech is: Kameny zmizelých, stones of the disappeared.
The Stolpersteine in Třeboň were laid on 6 June 2010. It was the third collocation in the Czech Republic, collocations in Brno and Ostrava followed several days later.

České Budějovice

Chlum u Třeboně

Třeboň

Dates of collocations 
The Stolpersteine in the Jihočeský kraj were collocated by the artist himself on the following dates:
 6 June 2010: Třeboň
 17 June 2013: Chlum u Třeboně
 14 September 2014 or 6 October 2014: České Budějovice

See also 
 List of cities by country that have stolpersteine
 Stolpersteine in the Czech Republic

External links

 stolpersteine.eu, Demnig's website
 holocaust.cz Czech databank of Holocaust victims

References

Jihočeský kraj
Stolpersteine
Holocaust commemoration